The 2013 Cork Premier Intermediate Football Championship was the eighth staging of the Cork Premier Intermediate Football Championship since its establishment by the Cork County Board in 2006. The draw for the opening round fixtures took place on 9 December 2012. The championship began on 5 May 2013 and ended on 13 October 2013.

St. Vincent's and Mayfield left the championship after their respective promotion and relegation to different grades. Castletownbere and Na Piarsaigh joined the championship. Kinsale were relegated from the championship after being beaten in a playoff by Carrigaline.

The final was played on 13 October 2013 at Páirc Uí Chaoimh in Cork, between Clyda Rovers, who were appearing in their fourth final in five seasons, and Macroom. Clyda Rovers won the match by 0-13 to 0-08 to claim their first championship title in the grade and a first title in any grade since 1996.

Conor Horgan and Gearóid Finn were the championship's top scorers.

Team changes

To Championship

Promoted from the Cork Intermediate Football Championship
 Castletownbere

Relegated from the Cork Senior Football Championship
 Na Piarsaigh

From Championship

Promoted to the Cork Senior Football Championship
 St. Vincent's

Relegated to the Cork Intermediate Football Championship
 Mayfield

Results

Round 1

Round 2

Round 3

Relegation playoff

Round 4

Quarter-finals

Semi-finals

Final

Championship statistics

Top scorers

Overall

In a single game

References

Cork Premier Intermediate Football Championship